Westminster Presbyterian Church may refer to:

Westminster Presbyterian Church of Australia
Westminster Presbyterian Church in the United States

Or it may refer to individual church buildings and/or congregations:

in Canada
Westminster Presbyterian Church (Ottawa)

in the United States 

Westminster Presbyterian Church (Alexandria, Virginia)
Westminster Presbyterian Church (Atlanta), led by Peter Marshall (preacher) from 1933 to 1937
Westminster Presbyterian Church (Buffalo, New York) (1858)
Westminster Presbyterian Church (Columbus, Ohio)
Westminster Presbyterian Church (Dayton)
Westminster Presbyterian Church (Devils Lake, North Dakota), NRHP-listed
Westminster Presbyterian Church (Los Angeles)
Westminster Presbyterian Church (Minneapolis, Minnesota), NRHP-listed
Westminster Presbyterian Church (Sacramento, California), listed on the U.S. National Register of Historic Places (NRHP)
Westminster Presbyterian Church (Topeka, Kansas), NRHP-listed
Westminster Presbyterian Church and Cemetery, a former church and current NRHP-listed site in Baltimore, Maryland